Mühlehorn railway station is a railway station in Mühlehorn, in the Swiss canton of Glarus. It is an intermediate stop on the Ziegelbrücke–Sargans line.

Layout and connections 
Mühlehorn has a  side platform with a single track ( 1). PostAuto Schweiz operates bus services from the station to Glarus Nord and Ziegelbrücke.  Schiffsbetrieb Walensee operates ferries on the Walensee from a ferry dock across the street from the station.

Services 
Mühlehorn is served by the S4 of the St. Gallen S-Bahn:

 : hourly service via St. Gallen (circular operation).

References

External links 
 
 

Railway stations in the canton of Glarus
Swiss Federal Railways stations